Mona Shaito (born 12 May 1994) is a Lebanese-American fencer, who along with her brother Zain Shaito, represented Lebanon in foil at the 2012 Olympic Games held in London.  Shaito was born and raised in Texas and attended Ohio State University, and holds Lebanese-American dual citizenship.

References

External links
 Mona Shaito profile at USA Fencing

Living people
1994 births
American people of Lebanese descent
American female foil fencers
Lebanese female foil fencers
Fencers at the 2010 Summer Youth Olympics
Fencers at the 2012 Summer Olympics
Fencers at the 2016 Summer Olympics
Olympic fencers of Lebanon
Fencers at the 2014 Asian Games
Fencers at the 2018 Asian Games
Lebanese people of Palestinian descent
American people of Palestinian descent
Sportspeople from Beirut
Asian Games competitors for Lebanon
Sportspeople of Lebanese descent
21st-century American women